Dorus is a figure in Greek mythology, founder of the Dorian nation.

Dorus may also refer to:
Dorus (mythology), several figures referred to by this name
Dorus (Crimea), historic fortress in Crimea
Tom Manders (Dutch artist) or Dorus (1921–1972), Dutch comedian
Dorus, Greek mythological figure, son of Apollo and Phthia, and the father of Xanthippe

People with the given name
Dorus Nijland (1880–1968), Dutch cyclist
Dorus Rijkers (1847–1928), Dutch lifeboat captain
Dorus de Vries (born 1980), Dutch footballer

People with the surname
Louis Dorus (1813–1896), French flutist

See also
Dora (given name)
Doris (disambiguation)
Doru (disambiguation)
Torus (disambiguation)